Oedebasis longipalpis is a moth of the family Erebidae first described by Emilio Berio in 1959. It is known from Madagascar, Mauritius, Réunion and the Seychelles.

References

Moths described in 1959
Calpinae
Moths of Madagascar
Moths of Mauritius
Moths of Réunion
Moths of Seychelles